A talent agent, or booking agent, is a person who finds jobs for actors, authors, broadcast journalists, film directors, musicians, models, professional athletes, screenwriters, writers, and other professionals in various entertainment or sports businesses. In addition, an agent defends, supports and promotes the interest of their clients. Talent agencies specialize, either by creating departments within the agency or developing entire agencies that primarily or wholly represent one specialty. For example, there are modeling agencies, commercial talent agencies, literary agencies, voice-over agencies, broadcast journalist agencies, sports agencies, music agencies and many more.

Having an agent is not required, but does help the artist in getting jobs (concerts, tours, movie scripts, appearances, signings, sport teams, etc.). In many cases, casting directors or other businesses go to talent agencies to find the artists for whom they are looking. The agent is paid a percentage of the star's earnings (typically 10%). Therefore, agents are sometimes referred to as "10 percenters". Various regulations govern different types of agents. The regulations are established by artist's unions and the legal jurisdiction in which the agent operates. There are also professional associations of talent agencies.

Talent agents are considered gatekeepers to their client's careers. They have the ability to reshape and reconstruct their client's image. They are dealmakers and assist their client by orchestrating deals within the entertainment industry, more specifically in the Hollywood entertainment industry.

In California, because talent agencies are working with lucrative contracts, the agencies must be licensed under special sections of the California Labor Code, which defines an agent as a "person or corporation who engages in the occupation of procuring, offering, promising, or attempting to procure employment for an artist or artists."

Types of talent agents and agencies

Sports agents

Literary agent

Broadcast journalist agencies
Some talent agencies specialize in the representation of television news broadcast journalists and television news magazine hosts. The journalists and hosts represented by these agents primarily work at television stations in local markets or at networks. There are many job titles for broadcast news journalists such as anchors, reporters, weathercasters, sportscasters, correspondents and hosts.

Commercial and theatrical agents
Actors may be interested in working theatrically (stage, film or television) as well as in commercials. Some agents will handle all types of acting work, while others may specialize in a particular area. Some agents work only in the field of television, or only in film and television. Typically, the larger the agency, the more specialized the agents within the agency.

An agent has two sets of clients:  the "talent" (actors, models, voice-over artists, etc.) and the "buyer". The buyer can be a casting director, advertising agency, production company, photographer, or direct client if the client has an "in-house" production staff. Agents promote talent to the buyers, submitting talent who have the appropriate age, race, sex, look, talent, etc. that the buyer is seeking for his/her project. Usually, an agent submits the actor's head shot or the model's composite card or portfolio to the buyer. After the buyer has made choices, the agent then arranges an audition (or for models, a "go-see" or open call). After the buyer has met the talent, the buyer will contact the agent if any of the talent will be hired. The agent will coordinate the details of wardrobe, directions, etc., as well as negotiate the contract or pay.

Note that the agent's job is to get the talent auditions; the talent is the only person who can get the job. For their work, agents take a 10 to 20% commission of the gross, depending on whether the job is union (such as SAG-AFTRA) or not. Union jobs are paid per negotiated guidelines, but in non-union jobs the pay is sometimes delayed.

A well established agent will have networks upon networks of contacts. Also, agents have access to professional casting services. Many of these casting resources are not available to the general public.

Although most of the successful agents are private individuals unknown to the public, some are celebrities in their own right. Notable current and former talent agents includes David Begelman, Ari Emanuel, Freddie Fields, Johnny Hyde, Irving Paul Lazar, Sue Mengers, Quincy Sims, Lew Wasserman, Jadin Wong and The Handbook.

Youth & young adult agents
Youth agents are a specialization or subset of theatrical and commercial agents that represent children, teenagers, and young adults. In addition to representation, youth agents must navigate the additional requirements surrounding minors including; legal, educational, parents, and family dynamics. In the U.S., all states have child labor laws that apply to the entertainment industry. In California, the center of the entertainment industry, there are specific industry regulations and laws to protect minors working in entertainment that include: limited working hours and a requirement to set aside a portion of earnings into a trust.

Modeling agencies

Music agents
In the music world, booking agents are different from talent managers. Booking agents are the people who actually book shows for the artists they represent. These agents make all of the arrangements with the promoters of the shows. The booking agent presents the promoter or producer of the concert with a performance agreement, which stipulates the artist's requirements. Items may include lighting, sound, meals, hotel accommodations, and transportation. For concert buyers, they work to find the artist who will fit in the need and available budget.

Many of the major booking agencies refuse to represent clients who are not already signed to a major record label and have national distribution of their music. Because of this, artists on independent record labels often seek representation with an independent booking agency.

Bars and nightclubs that specialize in presenting live music on a regular basis often employ an individual to assemble the schedule of events. This individual is the venue's buyer, and should not be confused with the booking agent, who presents a roster of available acts to the buyer. Booking agents may also have contacts known as promoters. These are individuals who agree to produce a snake game by locating a wide open field, providing a sound system and assembling a staff. Producing a show in this manner, at a location rented out for a single evening, is called "four-walling", as the process entails renting a venue and receiving no additional services or technical equipment other than the space itself. This has often been the only available option for underground musicians lacking enough popular appeal to gain access to more conventional performance venues (see: Punk rock), but is also used among the genre of raves and various DJ-related events.

The cost factor of having a booking agent must be weighed against what the agent can do for clients and buyers alike. Some agents represent several different types of artists, while others represent artists in one main area/genre.

Some music agencies deal exclusively with cover bands, listing exclusive and non-exclusive artists on their rosters. In addition, some agencies will also work with a third-party company to build specific bands using their own database of vetted musicians, whilst other cover band agencies work with session musicians, that provide a 'flexible' line up for each act.

Cruise ship industry
Booking agents are also used for the cruise ship industry where several different categories of entertainers are needed. These can include individual musicians to be part of the ship's orchestra, small bands and ensembles as well as variety entertainers such as singers, instrumentalists, magicians, comedians and acrobats. Artists looking to work on cruise ships will sign an employment contract with the cruise line and a separate commission contract with the booking agent. The agent will usually be based in the country of origin for the artist.

Music managers

A music manager (or band manager) handles many career issues for bands, singers, record producers, and DJs. A music manager is hired by a musician or band to help with determining decisions related to career moves, bookings, promotions, business deals, recording contracts, etc. The role of music managers is extensive and may include similar duties to that of a press agent, promoter, booking agent, business manager (who is sometimes a certified public accountant), tour managers, and sometimes even a personal assistant. Responsibilities of a business manager are often divided among many individuals who manage various aspects of a musical career. With an unsigned act, music managers must assume multiple roles: booking agent, graphic designer, publicist, promoter, and accountant. As an artist's career develops, responsibilities grow. A music manager becomes important to managing the many different pieces that make up a career in music. The manager can assist singers, songwriters, and instrumentalists in molding a career, finding music producers, and developing relationships with record companies, publishers, agents, and the music-loving public. The duties of an active music manager will focus on developing a reputation for the musician and building a fan base, which may include mastering and launching a demo CD, developing and releasing press kits, planning promotional activities, and booking shows. A music manager will gain access to a recording studio, photographers, and promotions. He or she will see that CD labels, posters, and promotional materials appropriately represent the band or artist, and that press kits are released in a timely manner to appropriate media. Launching a CD with complementary venues and dates is also a music manager's responsibility.

Online voice talent agents
With the advent of the internet, established and new talent can have a thriving career in the voice over industry through online casting websites. Whilst there are sites that allow any person to join, a new wave of 'professionals only' casting websites is emerging. In an industry where radio and television voice overs can be recorded in home studios because of technology becoming so affordable, high paying jobs are no longer sourced exclusively through traditional voice talent agents.

History
Since the decline in viewership in theaters, from the 1950s to 1960s, a monumental shift occurred in how studios produced films and reduced the cost of exclusive and expensive actors. After the shift, actors and actresses were working for the studios but were not owned by one major studio entity, and so were able to work with other studios. This shift has meant that agents were now seen as a necessity instead of an option. Agents became third parties who negotiated between studios and clients, making the need for the agents' services an imperative for each party.

In the 1980s new agencies were established to compete with the "Big five."  In 1991 Bauer-Benedek merged with Leading Artists Agency to form what became United Talent Agency. These agencies were Traid Artists and InterTalent. Traid Artist would eventually be sold to William Morris Agency in 1992, and InterTalent would diminish when its partners dispersed between UTA and ICM in the same year.

, the top three Hollywood talent agencies are William Morris Endeavor (WME), Creative Artists Agency (CAA), and United Talent Agency (UTA). Except for ICM Partners, each agency has its own affiliated production company, which may hire the agency's clients. In 1989 the three major agencies were William Morris, ICM, and CAA. During the 2000s, the majors were known as the "big five" or "top five". In 2009 Endeavor Talent Agency and William Morris merged.

Difference between agents and managers
The difference between the roles of agents and managers has become smaller and more blurred. A frequent definition of the role of a talent manager is to "oversee the day-to-day business affairs of an artist; advise and counsel talent concerning professional matters, long-term plans and personal decisions which may affect their career." Considerable overlap exists as talent agents may opt to fill exactly the same roles for their clients out of a financial interest in developing the careers of their talent and currying their favor.

Various state laws and labor guild rules govern the roles reserved to agents, as well as specifying certain special rights, privileges, and prohibitions. In the state of California, the labor code requires licensing of talent agencies and includes regulations such as criminal background checks, maintaining separate operating accounts and client trust accounts, and limits total commissions to twenty-five percent, among other regulations. In contrast, management companies are described as "often unregulated." Agents also have certain privileged powers in situations of verbal agreement and can legally agree to a binding employment offer on behalf of their client.

A prominent difference between agents and managers under California state law is that licensed talent agents and employment agents are the only entities legally allowed to seek work on behalf of their clients. This legal distinction has enabled artists such as the Deftones, Pamela Anderson, Nia Vardalos, Freddie Prinze Jr., and others to break contracts with their managers and avoid commissions owed according to those contracts by proving "unlicensed procurement" in court. Because the enforcement against talent managers procuring work is largely carried out through civil litigation and not criminal penalties, managers directly seek out work in defiance of state laws, as clients out of self-interest will seldom object to them doing so and cases alleging illegal procurement are infrequent.

The Writer's Guild, Screen Actor's Guild, and Director's Guild, among labor guilds, strike agency franchise agreements that specify certain regulations and privileges reserved solely for agents including setting maximum commissions at ten percent of a talent's gross earnings.  Managers do not face the same restrictions.

See also
Talent manager
Entertainment law
Literary agent (writers' agents)
Modeling agency
Music law
Sports law

References

Further reading 
Passman, Donald S. All You Need To Know About the Music Business: 6th Edition
Kerr, Judy, Acting Is Everything: An Actor's Guidebook for a Successful Career in Los Angeles
Callen, K. The Los Angeles Agent Book

 
Arts occupations
Entertainment occupations